The 1947 Australian Championships was a tennis tournament that took place on outdoor Grass courts at the White City Tennis Club, Sydney, Australia from 18 January to 27 January. It was the 35th edition of the Australian Championships (now known as the Australian Open), the 10th held in Sydney, and the first Grand Slam tournament of the year. The singles titles were won by Australians Dinny Pails and Nancye Wynne Bolton.

Finals

Men's singles

 Dinny Pails defeated   John Bromwich  4–6, 6–4, 3–6, 7–5, 8–6

Women's singles

  Nancye Wynne Bolton defeated   Nell Hall Hopman  6–3, 6–2

Men's doubles
 John Bromwich /  Adrian Quist defeated  Frank Sedgman /  George Worthington 6–1, 6–3, 6–1

Women's doubles
 Thelma Coyne Long /  Nancye Wynne Bolton defeated  Mary Bevis /  Joyce Fitch 6–3, 6–3

Mixed doubles
 Nancye Wynne Bolton /  Colin Long defeated  Joyce Fitch /  John Bromwich 6–3, 6–3

References

External links
 Australian Open official website

Australian Championships (tennis) by year
Australian Championships
Australian Championships (tennis)
January 1947 sports events in Australia